Siola is a genus of lady beetles in the family Coccinellidae. There are about two described species in Siola.

Species
Siola boillaei Mulsant, 1850

References

Coccinellidae
Coccinellidae genera